Dominican Republic competed at the 2017 World Games held in Wrocław, Poland.

Medalists

Karate 

Deivis Ferreras won the bronze medal in the men's kumite 67 kg event.

Water skiing 

Robert Pigozzi competed in the men's slalom event.

References 

Nations at the 2017 World Games
2017 in Dominican Republic sport
2017